The Măieruș is a left tributary of the river Olt in Romania. It flows into the Olt in the village Măieruș.

References

Rivers of Romania
Rivers of Brașov County